In geometry, the truncated order-7 square tiling is a uniform tiling of the hyperbolic plane. It has Schläfli symbol of t0,1{4,7}.

Related polyhedra and tiling

References
 John H. Conway, Heidi Burgiel, Chaim Goodman-Strass, The Symmetries of Things 2008,  (Chapter 19, The Hyperbolic Archimedean Tessellations)

See also

Uniform tilings in hyperbolic plane
List of regular polytopes

External links 

 Hyperbolic and Spherical Tiling Gallery
 KaleidoTile 3: Educational software to create spherical, planar and hyperbolic tilings
 Hyperbolic Planar Tessellations, Don Hatch

Hyperbolic tilings
Isogonal tilings
Order-7 tilings
Square tilings
Truncated tilings
Uniform tilings